National Road 97 (abbreviated DK 97) is a route which joins the A4 Motorway (at the junction Rzeszów West) with the road Rzecha (at the Jacek Kuroń roundabout) in Rzeszów. The route was built after the decision 60 made by the General Directorate for National Roads and Highways on the 20 December 2013, which was put in place from 1 January 2014.

Route plan

References

97